The Connected Places Catapult is the UK government's innovation agency for cities, transport and place leadership. It is one of several Catapult centres.

History

The organisation was formerly known as the Future Cities Catapult and also the Transport Systems Catapult, which were joined together on 1 April 2019. It works with Innovate UK, in Swindon (Wiltshire). A Deep Academic Alliance agreement was signed with UK universities in July 2018.

Future Cities Catapult
The Future Cities Catapult opened in London in 2013, to develop smart cities. Its first chairman was Sir David King, a professor of physical chemistry who was previously the government's Chief Scientific Adviser.

Transport Systems Catapult
The Transport Systems Catapult opened in June 2014 in Milton Keynes, Buckinghamshire, directly west of Witan Gate House. The TSC worked with Wayra UK.

Sites

A site at the University of Leeds (at a new innovation centre that opened in 2018) opened in May 2019. A site at the University of Strathclyde in Glasgow is at Innovo, next to the University of Strathclyde Technology and Innovation Centre, and west of the High Street railway station.

Projects
The organisation researches intelligent transportation systems and automated driving systems.

References

External links
 
 Future Cities Catapult
 Transport Systems Catapult
Centre for Connected and Autonomous Vehicles – Department for Transport and the Department for Business, Energy & Industrial Strategy

2019 establishments in the United Kingdom
Automotive industry in the United Kingdom
Catapult centres
Clerkenwell
College and university associations and consortia in the United Kingdom
Government agencies established in 2019
Organisations based in Milton Keynes
Organisations based in the London Borough of Islington
Science and technology in Buckinghamshire
Science and technology in Glasgow
Science and technology in West Yorkshire
Transport in the London Borough of Islington
Transport organisations based in the United Kingdom
Transport research organizations
University of Leeds
University of Strathclyde